The Roaring Forties (French: Les quarantièmes rugissants) is a 1982 French drama film directed by Christian de Chalonge and starring Jacques Perrin, Julie Christie and Michel Serrault. The film was loosely based on the book The Strange Last Voyage of Donald Crowhurst by Nicholas Tomalin about the death of the British round the world yachtsman Donald Crowhurst in 1969.

The film's sets were designed by the art director Max Douy. It was partly made at the Billancourt Studios in Paris. Location shooting took place around Finistère.

Cast
 Jacques Perrin as Julien Dantec
 Julie Christie as Catherine Dantec
 Michel Serrault as Sébastien Barral
 Gila von Weitershausen as Emilie Dubuisson
 Heinz Weiss as Joss
 Jean Leuvrais as Dorange
 François Perrot as TV Host
 Christian Ferry as Granville
 Bernard Lincot as Janvier
 Eric Raphaël as Denis Dantec
 Solena Morane as Valérie Dantec
 Mohammed Jalloh as Carlos
 Guy Parigot as Gouarzin
 Sébastien Keran as Jaouen
 René Dupré as Pietro Corres

References

External links

1982 films
French drama films
West German films
1982 drama films
1980s French-language films
Films directed by Christian de Chalonge
Films produced by Jacques Perrin
Sailing films
Films shot at Billancourt Studios
Gaumont Film Company films
1980s French films